"All in White" is a single by English indie rock band the Vaccines, the fourth to be released from their first album, What Did You Expect from The Vaccines?.

Music video
A music video to accompany the release of "All in White" was released onto YouTube on 18 May 2011, at a total length of four minutes and thirty-nine seconds.

Track listing

Credits and personnel
Lead vocals – The Vaccines
Producers – Dan Grech-Marguerat
Lyrics –  The Vaccines
Label: Columbia Records

Chart performance

Release history

References

External links

2011 singles
The Vaccines songs
2011 songs
Columbia Records singles